Leland Archer (born 8 January 1996) is a Trinidadian professional footballer who plays as a defender for Charleston Battery in the USL Championship.

Career

Youth and college
Archer played four years of college soccer at the College of Charleston between 2014 and 2017.

While at college, Archer appeared for USL PDL side South Georgia Tormenta during their 2017 season.

Professional
On 10 May 2018, Archer signed with United Soccer League club Charleston Battery.

On 11 November 2020, Archer took part in a Trial with Scottish Premiership club Hibernian FC. These trials took place after Charleston Battery became official partners with Hibernian.

Archer scored his first professional goal on 22 September 2021, against New York Red Bulls II, in his 66th appearance with the club. He scored again the following match, on 25 September 2021, against Pittsburgh Riverhounds SC. He was subsequently named to the USL Championship Team of the Week for his complete performance that matchweek.

Archer played his 100th match for the Battery, across all competitions, on 15 October 2022, in a 1-1 draw with Loudoun United FC.

International career
He made his debut for Trinidad and Tobago national football team on 31 January 2021 in a friendly game against the United States. He played the full game. Archer has been called up to numerous national team camps since his debut and made his second appearance on 29 January 2023 in a friendly against Saint Martin, playing a full 90 minutes in the 2-0 victory.

Honors

Individual
USL Championship All-League Second Team: 2020

References

1996 births
Living people
Trinidad and Tobago footballers
College of Charleston Cougars men's soccer players
Tormenta FC players
Charleston Battery players
USL League Two players
USL Championship players
Trinidad and Tobago under-20 international footballers
Trinidad and Tobago international footballers
Association football defenders
2015 CONCACAF U-20 Championship players